Himachal Pradesh Board of School Education is agency Government of Himachal Pradesh entrusted with the responsibilities of prescribing courses of instructions and text books  and conducting examinations for secondary school students in Himachal Pradesh . It was set up in 1969 and has its headquarters in Dharmshala. Kultar chand Rana from Kangra was the first chairman. At present more than 8000 schools are affiliated with the Board. The Board  sets up 1650 examination centres for over 500,000 examinees every year. Dr. Madhu Chaudhary (HAS) is the current Secretary of the HPBOSE appointment by the Government of Himachal Pradesh. Dr Suresh Soni is the current chairman of the board.

History

The Himachal Pradesh Board of School Education, Dharamshala came into existence in 1969 as per Himachal Pradesh Act No. 14 of 1968 with its headquarter at Shimla later shifted to Dharamshala in January 1983. The Board started with a staff of 34 officials which has subsequently increased to 438. The Education Board prescribes syllabus, courses of instructions and text books for school education in Himachal Pradesh besides conducting examinations based on courses listed. At present, the Board conducts examination for the following classes and courses: 
8th (Private Capacity), 10th, 10+1, 10+2, J.B.T and T.T.C. As many as 5 Lakh candidates annually appear in the examination conducted by the Board. Presently more than 8000 schools are affiliated with the Board. The Board has set up 1650 Examination centres throughout the state. Board also publishes text books for class 1st to 12th. Apart from a Liaison Office at Shimla, the Board has also established 19 Sale Book Depots/Information Centres in the state to cater to the needs of students.

HP board take state level examination for 10th and 12th standard in March.

References

External links

State agencies of Himachal Pradesh
Education in Himachal Pradesh
1969 establishments in Himachal Pradesh
State secondary education boards of India
Government agencies established in 1969